Johnny Cochrane was a Scottish football manager.

Career
Cochrane was born in Paisley. As a player, he had a short spell with Johnstone in Scottish Division Two, records showing he also acted as the club's secretary, then was their manager in 1915.

Cochrane was manager of St Mirren from 1916 until 1928. He helped the club win the Victory Cup in 1919, the Barcelona Cup in 1922 and the Scottish Cup in 1926, as the Buddies won 2–0 against Celtic at Hampden Park.

The Paisley-born manager arrived at Sunderland in 1928, replacing Bob Kyle. He went on to manage the Wearside club for 500 games, winning the Football League First Division in 1935–36 season. Cochrane also led Sunderland to success in the FA Cup with a 3–1 win over Preston North End in the 1937 FA Cup Final. He retired as Sunderland manager on 3 March 1939. He managed Reading later in 1939, but left after just 13 days in the post.

Honours 

St Mirren
Scottish Cup: 1925–26

Sunderland
Football League First Division: 1935–36
FA Charity Shield: 1936 
FA Cup: 1936–37

See also 
 List of English football championship winning managers
 List of Scottish Cup winning managers

References 

 

Footballers from Paisley, Renfrewshire
Sunderland A.F.C. managers
Scottish football managers
Reading F.C. managers
St Mirren F.C. managers
Year of birth unknown
Year of death unknown
Scottish Football League managers
English Football League managers
Johnstone F.C. players
Scottish footballers
Association football inside forwards
Scottish Football League players